Calayan may refer to:

 Calayan, Cagayan, municipality in the Philippines
 Calayan Island, one of the four islands of the municipality
 Calayan rail, a bird endemic to the Philippines
 Manny Calayan, celebrity Filipino cosmetic surgeon